Seyyed Ali, Lorestan may refer to:

Seyyed Ali, Delfan
Seyyed Ali, Kakavand